Sudan competed at the 1968 Summer Olympics in Mexico City, Mexico.

Athletics

Men
Track & road events

Boxing

Men

References
Official Olympic Reports
sports-reference

Nations at the 1968 Summer Olympics
1968